Union Leader is a 2017 Indian drama film directed by Sanjay Patel and starring Rahul Bhat and Tillotama Shome. The film follows the story of a chemical factory supervisor who raises the issue of worker's health and safety against an unsympathetic management.

Plot 
Jay Gohil (Bhat) is employed as supervisor at a chromium sulfate factory of Apollo Chemicals in Gujarat. The workers there are experiencing deteriorating health conditions; respiratory diseases and cancers and five eventually succumb to their illness, all because of the poor working conditions at the factory. Leader of their union is in cahoots with the factory management and turns a blind eye to their problems. Reluctantly Jay becomes the voice of his colleagues and demands wage hike and medical insurance. Angered by the workers' demands, factory owner decides to shut it down.

Jay's son Harsh (Tirth Sharma) believes in Gandhism and plays a key role in raising the workers' issues.

Cast 
 Rahul Bhat as Jay
 Tillotama Shome as Geeta
 Jayesh More as Manoj
 Samvedna Suwalka as Rita
 Jay Vithlani as Anand
 Chetan Daiya
 Mehul Buch

Production 
Patel had worked as chemical engineer in Gujarat before moving to Canada. He based the film on his observations of the workers in chemical factories in Gujarat. The project began under the title Kamdar Union and marked Patel's maiden attempt at making a full-length feature film. Costumes worn by actors in the film were bought from a local market and were "age[d]" using "herbal colours and other products" in 11–12 days each.

The filming took place at Vatva, Ahmedabad and other places in Gujarat and it was wrapped up towards the end of December 2016. Patel cast Indian actors for his film and managed the finances himself. However, the post-production work was done in Calgary, Canada and the film's title was changed to Union Leader.

Release
The film was released in theatres on 19 January 2018. A special screening of the film was held at the Suncor Energy Centre, Fort McMurray in November 2017.

Reception
Though critical of the film, Anna MM Vetticad in her review for Firstpost praised Bhat's performance and gave the film a 1.5/5 rating. He opined that the film's "[commitment] to its cause" was its strength and that Bhat had brought an "X factor to his performance" which exceeded the screenplay's limitations. He, however, felt that the supporting characters had not been used "effectively" which robbed the film of its "emotional stirrings". Nandini Ramnath of Scroll.in was appreciative of the film's "sympathetic portrayal of the workers", noting that the "convincing cast of supporting actors ... actually look like blue-collared representatives rather than Bollywood extras". She wrote that the remaining cast "works better" than Bhat who was "passable".

Pallabi Dey Purkayastha of The Times of India gave the film a 2.5/5 rating, noting that although the film showed "pragmatism" but "crumbles towards the end because of poor execution". Ravi Bule of Amar Ujala wrote that Shome did justice to her role, while rating the film 2/5.

Accolades

References

External links

2010s Hindi-language films
Indian drama films
2018 drama films
Films shot in Gujarat
Canadian drama films
Hindi-language drama films
2010s Canadian films